The 2018 WNBA season will be the 21st season for the Dallas Wings franchise of the WNBA. This will be the franchise's 3rd season in Dallas.  The season tips off on May 18.

Dallas had an up and down start to the season, posting a 2–3 record in May followed by a 5–4 record in June.  However all but one of these seven losses came to eventual playoff teams. The team posted an 8–5 record in July, including winning 7 of 8 games in the middle of the month.  The three straight losses at the end of the month were the beginning of a nine-game losing streak.

In the midst of that losing streak, on August 12, 2018 the Wings fired their head coach Fred Williams.  The team had a 14–17 record and was in the 8th and final playoff spot at the time of firing.  Assistant Coach Taj McWilliams-Franklin was named the interim head coach for the remainder of the season.

McWilliams-Franklin posted a 1–2 record in her three games in charge.  This saw the Wings finish 1–7 in August.  However, the one win was an important one.  The win was against the Las Vegas Aces, the Wing's playoff rivals.  The Wings secured the 8th seed in the 2018 WNBA Playoffs by one game over the Aces.  The team lost to the 5th seeded Phoenix Mercury 83–101 in the first round of the playoffs to end their season.

Transactions

WNBA Draft

Trades and roster changes

Current roster

Game log

Pre-season

|- style="background:#bbffbb;"
| 1
| May 7
| vs. New York
| W 76–69
| Stevens (19)
| Stevens (9)
| Chong (3)
| Mohegan Sun ArenaN/A
| 1–0
|- style="background:#fcc;"
| 2
| May 8
| @ Connecticut
| L 58–79
| Tied (12)
| Cambage (9)
| Hamblin (2)
| Mohegan Sun Arena3,695
| 1–1
|- style="background:#bbffbb;"
| 3
| May 13
| Las Vegas
| W 68–55
| Stevens (12)
| 4 Tied (6)
| Chong (4)
| College Park CenterN/A
| 2–1

Regular season

|- style="background:#fcc;"
| 1
| May 18
| @ Phoenix
| L 78–86
| Tied (18)
| Cambage (9)
| Diggins–Smith (9)
| Talking Stick Resort Arena11,210
| 0–1
|- style="background:#bbffbb;"
| 2
| May 20
| Atlanta
| W 101–78
| Diggins–Smith (25)
| Christmas–Kelly (10)
| Davis (5)
| College Park Center5,907
| 1–1
|- style="background:#fcc;"
| 3
| May 23
| @ Minnesota
| L 68–76
| Cambage (14)
| Cambage (12)
| Diggins–Smith (7)
| Target Center7,834
| 1–2
|- style="background:#bbffbb;"
| 4
| May 26
| @ Atlanta
| W 87–80
| Diggins–Smith (24)
| Cambage (14)
| Tied (4)
| McCamish Pavilion4,749
| 2–2
|- style="background:#fcc;"
| 5
| May 29
| @ New York
| L 89–94
| Cambage (28)
| Cambage (16)
| Diggins–Smith (7)
| Westchester County Center1,516
| 2–3

|- style="background:#bbffbb;"
| 6
| June 2
| Seattle
| W 94–90
| Diggins–Smith (27)
| Tied (7)
| Diggins–Smith (7)
| College Park Center5,191
| 3–3
|- style="background:#bbffbb;"
| 7
| June 8
| @ Indiana
| W 89–83
| Diggins–Smith (35)
| Diggins–Smith (12)
| Diggins–Smith (6)
| Bankers Life Fieldhouse5,675
| 4–3
|- style="background:#fcc;"
| 8
| June 12
| Phoenix
| L 72–75
| Diggins–Smith (16)
| Thornton (8)
| Diggins–Smith (4)
| College Park Center4,026
| 4–4
|- style="background:#bbffbb;"
| 9
| June 15
| Las Vegas
| W 77–67
| Cambage (28)
| Cambage (18)
| Diggins–Smith (6)
| College Park Center4,549
| 5–4
|- style="background:#fcc;"
| 10
| June 19
| @ Minnesota
| L 83–91
| Diggins–Smith (17)
| Cambage (9)
| Diggins–Smith (7)
| Target Center8,023
| 5–5
|- style="background:#bbffbb;"
| 11
| June 22
| Los Angeles
| W 101–72
| Cambage (20)
| Powers (8)
| Diggins–Smith (11)
| College Park Center5,672
| 6–5
|- style="background:#fcc;"
| 12
| June 24
| Seattle
| L 76–97
| Cambage (23)
| Cambage (9)
| Diggins–Smith (7)
| College Park Center4,084
| 6–6
|- style="background:#fcc;"
| 13
| June 26
| @ Los Angeles
| L 83–87
| Cambage (25)
| Cambage (14)
| Diggins–Smith (5)
| Staples Center10,002
| 6–7
|- style="background:#bbffbb;"
| 14
| June 27
| @ Las Vegas
| W 97–91
| Diggins–Smith (29)
| Cambage (11)
| Diggins–Smith (8)
| Mandalay Bay Events Center5,246
| 7–7

|- style="background:#fcc;"
| 15
| July 1
| Minnesota
| L 72–76
| Diggins–Smith (16)
| Johnson (8)
| Diggins–Smith (7)
| College Park Center4,448
| 7–8
|- style="background:#bbffbb;"
| 16
| July 3
| Chicago
| W 108–85
| Cambage (37)
| Cambage (10)
| Tied (5)
| College Park Center4,012
| 8–8
|- style="background:#bbffbb;"
| 17
| July 5
| Indiana
| W 90–63
| Stevens (26)
| Johnson (11)
| Diggins–Smith (7)
| College Park Center4,043
| 9–8
|- style="background:#bbffbb;"
| 18
| July 8
| @ New York
| W 97–87
| Diggins–Smith (32)
| Cambage (12)
| Gray (6)
| Westchester County Center1,719
| 10–8
|- style="background:#bbffbb;"
| 19
| July 10
| Phoenix
| W 101–72
| Diggins–Smith (20)
| Johnson (9)
| Tied (4)
| College Park Center4,034
| 11–8
|- style="background:#bbffbb;"
| 20
| July 12
| @ Los Angeles
| W 92–77
| Diggins–Smith (22)
| Johnson (7)
| Diggins–Smith (11)
| Staples Center13,502
| 12–8
|- style="background:#fcc;"
| 21
| July 14
| @ Seattle
| L 84–91
| Cambage (23)
| Stevens (9)
| Diggins–Smith (7)
| KeyArena9,686
| 12–9
|- style="background:#bbffbb;"
| 22
| July 17
| New York
| W 104–87
| Cambage (53)
| Cambage (10)
| Diggins–Smith (7)
| College Park Center6,459
| 13–9
|- style="background:#bbffbb;"
| 23
| July 19
| Washington
| W 90–81
| Cambage (35)
| Cambage (17)
| Diggins–Smith (7)
| College Park Center4,411
| 14–9
|- style="background:#fcc;"
| 24
| July 20
| @ Chicago
| L 99–114
| Cambage (23)
| Stevens (9)
| Tied (5)
| Wintrust Arena4,962
| 14–10
|- style="background:#fcc;"
| 25
| July 22
| Connecticut
| L 75–92
| Cambage (25)
| Cambage (10)
| Tied (5)
| College Park Center4,935
| 14–11
|- style="background:#fcc;"
| 26
| July 31
| Chicago
| L 91–92
| Cambage (33)
| Johnson (14)
| Gray (10)
| College Park Center3,696
| 14–12

|- style="background:#fcc;"
| 27
| August 2
| @ Indiana
| L 78–84
| Cambage (37)
| Tied (9)
| 4 Tied (3)
| Bankers Life Fieldhouse5,981
| 14–13
|- style="background:#fcc;"
| 28
| August 5
| Washington
| L 74–76
| Tied (16)
| Cambage (14)
| Tied (4)
| College Park Center5,623
| 14–14
|- style="background:#fcc;"
| 29
| August 8
| Connecticut
| L 92–101
| Cambage (29)
| Tied (9)
| Cambage (4)
| College Park Center3,483
| 14–15
|- style="background:#fcc;"
| 30
| August 11
| @ Atlanta
| L 82–92
| Diggins–Smith (26)
| Stevens (6)
| Diggins–Smith (10)
| McCamish Pavilion4,937
| 14–16
|- style="background:#fcc;"
| 31
| August 12
| @ Washington
| L 80–93
| Diggins–Smith (17)
| Gray (12)
| Diggins–Smith (6)
| Capital One Arena6,362
| 14–17
|- style="background:#fcc;"
| 32
| August 14
| @ Connecticut
| L 76–96
| Gray (18)
| Cambage (13)
| Diggins–Smith (8)
| Mohegan Sun Arena6,365
| 14–18
|- style="background:#bbffbb;"
| 33
| August 17
| Las Vegas
| W 107–102
| Cambage (43)
| Cambage (13)
| Diggins–Smith (8)
| College Park Center6,209
| 15–18
|- style="background:#fcc;"
| 34
| August 19
| @ Seattle
| L 68–84
| Johnson (16)
| Johnson (7)
| Diggins–Smith (4)
| KeyArena12,574
| 15–19

Playoffs

|- style="background:#fcc;"
| 1
| August 21
| @ Phoenix
| L 83–101
| Diggins–Smith (23)
| Cambage (12)
| Diggins–Smith (7)
| Wells Fargo Arena4,976
| 0–1

Standings

Playoffs

Statistics

Regular season

Awards and honors

References

External links
The Official Site of the Dallas Wings

Dallas Wings seasons
Dallas Wings